Yelena Vladimirovna Parfyonova (born 26 January 1974) is a retired Kazakhstani triple jumper. Her personal best jump is 14.33 metres, achieved in June 2008 in Almaty.

She won the gold medal at the 2000 Asian Championships, the silver medal at the 2002 Asian Championships and finished fourth at the 2005 Asian Championships. She also competed at the 2000 Olympic Games, the 2005 World Championships, the 2006 World Indoor Championships, the 2007 World Championships and the 2008 Olympic Games without reaching the final.

Achievements

References

1974 births
Living people
Kazakhstani female triple jumpers
Athletes (track and field) at the 2000 Summer Olympics
Athletes (track and field) at the 2008 Summer Olympics
Olympic athletes of Kazakhstan
Athletes (track and field) at the 2006 Asian Games
Asian Games competitors for Kazakhstan